Tanakia shimazui is a species of fish in the family Cyprinidae. It is endemic to Japan.

Etymology
Named in honor of “Mr. Shimazu” (no forename given), a naturalist in Tokyo, who collected type.

References

Tanakia
Taxa named by Shigeho Tanaka
Fish described in 1908